Atacira is a genus of moths of the family Euteliidae. The genus was described by Charles Swinhoe in 1900.

Species
Atacira affinis (Hampson, 1918) Taiwan
Atacira angulata Holloway, 1985 Peninsular Malaysia, Sumatra, Borneo
Atacira approximata (Walker, [1863]) Sundaland
Atacira barlowi Holloway, 1985 Peninsular Malaysia, Borneo
Atacira brunneata Holloway, 1985 Peninsular Malaysia, Sumatra, Borneo
Atacira caesia (Roepke, 1938) N.Sulawesi
Atacira chalybsa (Hampson, 1891) Oriental tropics to Sundaland
Atacira chalybsoides Holloway, 1985 Borneo
Atacira diehli (Kobes, 1982) Sumatra, Peninsular Malaysia, Borneo
Atacira dimidiata (Walker, [1863]) Sundaland, Philippines, Sulawesi
Atacira flaviluna (Hampson, 1905) Singapore, Borneo
Atacira glauca (Prout, 1928) Sumatra, Peninsular Malaysia
Atacira grabczewskii (Püngeler, 1904) Japan
Atacira josephinae (Holloway, 1976) Borneo
Atacira melanephra (Hampson, 1912) India, Sri Lanka
Atacira mima (Prout, 1925) Arabia, Eritrea, Tanzania, South Africa
Atacira olivacea Holloway, 1985 Borneo, Sumatra
Atacira olivaceiplaga (Bethune-Baker, 1906) New Guinea
Atacira pala Holloway, 1985 Borneo
Atacira rubrirena Holloway, 1985 Borneo, western Sumatra, western Sulawesi, New Guinea
Atacira smarti Holloway, 1985 Borneo
Atacira sommereri (Kobes, 1982) Sumatra, Peninsular Malaysia
Atacira waterstradti Holloway, 1985 Borneo
Atacira winseri Holloway, 1985 Borneo, Sumatra

References

Euteliinae
Noctuoidea genera